Passignano sul Trasimeno is a comune (municipality) in the Province of Perugia in the Italian region of  Umbria, located about 20 km northwest of Perugia.

Passignano was home to a historic Italian airplane factory, the SAI Ambrosini, now abandoned as an industrial center but still used as an association center. Its buildings still exist near the Passignano sul Trasimeno railway station.

Aircraft were tested at Eleuteri airport, only a few kilometers away from the factory. SAI was involved mainly with Macchi during World War II, although Eleuteri was also used as a test center for the Ambrosini SS.4.

Scuderia Coloni, a former Formula 1 and GP2 Series racing team which currently organizes the Auto GP Series, is located in Passignano sul Trasimeno.

References

External links
 Official website

Cities and towns in Umbria